John Yoder may refer to:
 John Howard Yoder, American theologian and ethicist
 John C. Yoder, American lawyer, judge and politician in West Virginia